The 2013–14 Canisius Golden Griffins men's basketball team represented Canisius College during the 2013–14 NCAA Division I men's basketball season. The Golden Griffins, led by second year head coach Jim Baron, played their home games at the Koessler Athletic Center and were members of the Metro Atlantic Athletic Conference. They finished the season 21–13, 14–6 in MAAC play to finish in a tie for third place. They advanced to the semifinals of the MAAC tournament where they lost to Iona. They were invited to the CollegeInsider.com Tournament where they lost in the first round to VMI.

Roster

Schedule

|-
!colspan=9 style="background:#0B2548; color:#EAAB20;"| Exhibition

|-
!colspan=9 style="background:#0B2548; color:#EAAB20;"| Regular season

|-
!colspan=9 style="background:#0B2548; color:#EAAB20;"| MAAC tournament

|-
!colspan=9 style="background:#0B2548; color:#EAAB20;"| CIT

References

Canisius Golden Griffins men's basketball seasons
Canisius
Canisius